The Valentin Taifun is a two-seat self-launching sailplane designed and built by Valentin Flugzeugbau GmbH of Hasfurt, Germany.

Design and development
The Taifun is an all glass-fibre low-wing cantilever monoplane with a T-tail and side-by-side seating for two occupants. It has a manually operated retractable tricycle landing gear. The Taifun is powered originally by an 80 hp (60 kW) Limbach L2000EB (Volkswagen) engine with later production aircraft being fitted with 90 hp (67 kW) Limbach L2400EB engine. The wings fold back along the fuselage sides for transportation and storage. The prototype, registered D-KONO, first flew on the 28 February 1981. The main production aircraft had a 17-metre wingspan and was designated the Taifun 17E. Two examples of aircraft with a 12-metre wingspan were built as the Taifun 12E which were classed as light-aircraft rather than a motor glider. An improved four-seat Taifun 11S was studied with a 115 hp (86 kW) Lycoming O-235 engine and fixed landing gear but the design was abandoned.

Variants
Taifun 17E
Main production variant with a 17 metre wingspan and a Limbach flat-four engine.
Taifun 17E II
Later production variant with a 17 metre wingspan and a Limbach flat-four engine or can be retrofitted with a Rotax 914, hydraulically operated landing gear, double panel Schempp-Hirth type airbrakes on the upper wing surface. aka WI Taifun 17 EII
Taifun 12E
Variant with a 12 metre wingspan, two built.
Taifun 11S
Planned variant with four-seats, not built.

Aircraft on display
Deutsches Museum Flugwerft Schleissheim, near Munich, Germany.

Specifications (17E)

See also

References

Bibliography

External links

 European Aviation Safety Agency Type Certificate Data Sheet - Taifun 17E

1980s German sailplanes
Motor gliders
T-tail aircraft
Single-engined tractor aircraft
Low-wing aircraft
Aircraft first flown in 1981